Joseph M. Holbrook ( -1884) was a member of the Iowa State Legislature in the 19th-century. He also served in the Union Army during the American Civil War.

Sources
Document relating to Holbrook

1884 deaths
Members of the Iowa House of Representatives